Gap junction proteins

Gap junction α (GJA) proteins
 GJA1, gap junction alpha-1 protein
 GJA2, gap junction alpha-2 protein
 GJA3, gap junction alpha-3 protein
 GJA4, gap junction alpha-4 protein
 GJA5, gap junction alpha-5 protein
 GJA6, gap junction alpha-6 protein
 GJA7, gap junction alpha-7 protein
 GJA8, gap junction alpha-8 protein
 GJA9, gap junction alpha-9 protein
 GJA10, gap junction alpha-10 protein
 GJA11, gap junction alpha-11 protein
 GJA12, gap junction alpha-12 protein

Gap junction β (GJB) proteins
 GJB1, gap junction beta-1 protein
 GJB2, gap junction beta-2 protein
 GJB3, gap junction beta-3 protein
 GJB4, gap junction beta-4 protein
 GJB5, gap junction beta-5 protein
 GJB6, gap junction beta-6 protein
 GJB7, gap junction beta-7 protein

Gap junction γ (GJC) proteins
 GJC1, gap junction gamma-1 protein
 GJC2, gap junction gamma-2 protein
 GJC3, gap junction gamma-3 protein

Gap junction δ (GJD) proteins
 GJD1, gap junction delta-1 protein
 GJD2, gap junction delta-2 protein
 GJD3, gap junction delta-3 protein
 GJD4, gap junction delta-4 protein

See also
 Tight junction protein